Dapol Ltd is a model railway manufacturer based in Chirk, Wales. The factory where some of the design and manufacturing take place is just over the border in England. The company is known for its model railway products in N gauge, OO gauge and O gauge.

History
Dapol's name is a play on its founders David and Pauline Boyle's names. He owned a model concern Highfield Birds & Models. In 1981 he first tried to buy the Airfix and Mainline ranges.

The Dapol brand name was first used in a Railway Modeller advert of September 1983. The first Dapol wagons (for OO) were announced to become available on 20 November 1983. From 1 March 1984 ex Airfix railway kits became available.

Later in the year Railway Modeller magazine carried a two-page profile of the new concern with the upbeat title 'An exciting new model empire'. A lot of David Boyle's background was explored. Some of Dapol's ambitions were frustrated. That article said that the Austerity 2-8-0 and the LMS Beyer Garratt were both under development for 1985 but they never appeared from Dapol. However the L&YR Pug, the Austerity 0-6-0ST and the GWR Hawksworth County which were announced early in 1984 were all produced promptly, well reviewed and have had long model lives. At this time the operation was headquartered in Navigation Road, Northwich.

During 1985 Dapol successfully bought Mainline (and thereby the former Airfix) model railway ranges from Palitoy.

It was announced in the Railway Modeller of February 1989 that Dapol had bought the former Trix/British Liliput range from Ernest Rosza. The Dapol 1989 catalogue also showed that the Model-Land building range had been bought.

In 1994, while the company was moving to Llangollen in North Wales, a fire destroyed the old site at Winsford in Cheshire, and large quantities of products and historical Wrenn material were destroyed.

In 1996 Dapol sold many of its inherited model railway lines to Hornby.

In 1998 the company came under the control of a new board of directors headed by George Smith. The company remains in the ownership of the Boyle family who founded the company.

In 2001 Dapol sold the little-exploited Wrenn product line (bought in 1993 from Wrenn) and trading name to three Wrenn collectors.

From 1988 to 2001 Dapol also produced a wide range of Doctor Who action figures. In 2002 the BBC declined to renew the licence. The Dapol site also hosted the 'BBC Doctor Who Experience' exhibition until 2003.

In 2004 Dapol was awarded the 'UK Small Business of the Year' award.

In 2007 Dapol was awarded the Model Rail magazine 'N-gauge Manufacturer of the Year' award.

In 2010 Dapol were awarded the Model Rail magazine 'N-gauge manufacturer of the year', 'Best N gauge steam loco of the year' (Terrier), 'Best N-gauge Diesel locomotive of the year' (class 67), Best N-gauge Rolling Stock of the year (MK3 coach) making a clean sweep for all the awards for N gauge.

In 2010, following the retirement of managing director George Smith,  Dapol welcomed his replacement, Joel Bright, a director for the previous eight years and uncle of the current owner, Craig Boyle.

Products

N gauge
Dapol manufactures a growing range of N gauge locomotives, coaches and wagons, and is the main competitor of Graham Farish in the British 'ready-to-run' market. Continuous improvement in model specifications has led to the introduction of 40:1 gearing in locomotive drive mechanisms, NEM couplings on all stock, and LED lighting strips for coaching stock - yellow for 'older' coaches, to represent incandescent illumination, and white for more modern coaches and EMUs to represent fluorescent fittings.

OO Gauge

In 00 gauge, Dapol manufactures ready-to-run locomotives, wagons and kits.

Kits are moulded in grey polystyrene and the range features buildings, road vehicles, wagons and locos. Some of the kits use moulds bought in 1993 from the Airfix company, some of which in turn originated with Kitmaster prior to being bought by Airfix in 1962. Others have come from the Lines Brothers Model-Land range.

The first OO scale locomotives to be entirely originated by Dapol were the L&YR Pug 0-4-0ST, the Austerity 0-6-0ST and GWR County 4-6-0 generated in 1984/5. The next was the LB&SCR Terrier. This was shown in the 1988 catalogue having been announced at the 1987 Toy Fair.

External links
Dapol official website

References

Privately held companies of Wales
Model railroad manufacturers
Toy train manufacturers
Welsh brands
Model manufacturers of the United Kingdom